Two ships of United States Navy have been named Agile.

 , was a wooden coastal minesweeper in service from 1941 to 1946.
 , was a non-ferromagnetic ocean minesweeper launched in 1955 and sold in 1980.

Sources
 

United States Navy ship names